Miahuatlán Zapotec, also known as Cuixtla Zapotec, is a Zapotec language spoken in southern Oaxaca, Mexico.

References

Sources
 Ruegsegger, Manis & Jane Ruegsegger. 1955. Vocabulario zapoteco del dialecto de Miahuatlán del Estado de Oaxaca. Mexico City: Instituto Lingüístico de Verano.

Zapotec languages

Languages of Mexico
Oto-Manguean languages